James Van de Velde is the name of:

 James Oliver Van de Velde (17951855), Roman Catholic Bishop of Chicago between 1849 and 1853
 James Van de Velde (Yale lecturer), former person of interest in the murder of Suzanne Jovin